Lachnocnema sosia is a butterfly in the family Lycaenidae. It is found in Uganda, Kenya, the Democratic Republic of the Congo and northern Tanzania.

References

Butterflies described in 1996
Taxa named by Michel Libert
Miletinae